Entertaining Angels: The Dorothy Day Story is a 1996 independent film about the life of Dorothy Day, the journalist turned social activist and founder of the Catholic Worker newspaper. The film stars Moira Kelly as Day, Heather Graham, Lenny Von Dohlen and Martin Sheen.

Writer John Wells and actors Kelly and Sheen also collaborated in the NBC dramatic series The West Wing. Kelly, Graham, and Von Dohlen previously appeared in David Lynch's Twin Peaks: Fire Walk with Me.

Cast
Moira Kelly as Dorothy Day
Martin Sheen as Peter Maurin
Lenny Von Dohlen as Forster Batterham
Melinda Dillon as Sister Aloysius
Paul Lieber as Mike Gold
Heather Graham as Maggie Bowen
Boyd Kestner as Lionel Moise
James Lancaster as Eugene O'Neill
Geoffrey Blake as Floyd Dell
Tracey Walter as Joe Bennett
Brian Keith as Cardinal
Thom Adcox-Hernandez as Dan Irwin
Allyce Beasley as Frankie
Val Bettin as Mr. Breen
Marianne Muellerleile as Landlady
Renée Estevez as Lilly Batterham
Redmond Gleeson as Irish Man

Reception

External links

Catholic Worker Movement
1996 films
1990s biographical drama films
American biographical drama films
American independent films
Films about activists
1996 independent films
1996 directorial debut films
1996 drama films
Dorothy Day
Biographical films about journalists
Films directed by Michael Ray Rhodes
1990s English-language films
1990s American films